Cheryl Gates McFadden (born March 2, 1949) is an American actress and choreographer. She is usually credited as Cheryl McFadden when working as a choreographer and Gates McFadden when working as an actress. She played Dr. Beverly Crusher in the Star Trek: The Next Generation television series and in the four subsequent films.

Early life

McFadden was born in Akron, Ohio. She attended Brandeis University, graduating with a Bachelor of Arts (cum laude) in the theatre arts, before moving to Paris, where she studied theatre with actor Jacques Lecoq at his school of physical theatre. McFadden is of Lithuanian descent on her mother's side.

Career

Early work

In the 1970s, McFadden spent time teaching in post-secondary theater and dance departments, including those of the University of Pittsburgh, Harvard University, and George Washington University. During this period she formed a theatrical company, The New York Theatre Commotion, and in 1975 toured an all-female clown act, "Commedia Dell Pinky".

McFadden worked at The Jim Henson Company as the director of choreography and puppet movement for Labyrinth, The Muppets Take Manhattan, and uncredited work on Dreamchild. As a way of distinguishing her acting work from her choreography, she is usually credited as "Gates McFadden" as an actress and "Cheryl McFadden" as a choreographer. However, she was credited as "Cheryl McFadden" in the Troma movie When Nature Calls (1985) and in the season-three episode of The Cosby Show, "Cliff's 50th Birthday". She appeared uncredited in The Hunt for Red October as Jack Ryan's wife, Caroline.

Star Trek: The Next Generation

Season 1
In 1987, McFadden was cast as Dr. Beverly Crusher on Star Trek: The Next Generation. The Crusher character was slated to be Captain Jean-Luc Picard's love interest; another important aspect of the character was being a widow balancing motherhood and a career. Maurice Hurley, head writer and showrunner, did not like working with McFadden and, at Hurley's demand, she was let go at the end of season one. Diana Muldaur joined the production as the Enterprises new chief medical officer, Dr. Katherine Pulaski, for the second season.

Seasons 3–7

Series creator Gene Roddenberry admitted that the Dr. Pulaski character did not develop a chemistry with the other characters, so McFadden was approached to return as Dr. Crusher for the third season. She was hesitant, but after a phone call from co-star Patrick Stewart, and numerous fan letters, McFadden was persuaded to return to the role, which she then played through the remainder of the series.

Highlights for her character included "The High Ground", where she is kidnapped by terrorists; "Remember Me", in which she becomes trapped in an alternate reality where her loved ones start to disappear; "The Host", which features a romance between the doctor and an alien composed of two symbiotic organisms; "Suspicions", in which she risks her career to solve the murder of a scientist; "Descent" where Crusher takes command of the Enterprise; "Sub Rosa", where she becomes the victim of a seductive "ghost"; and "Attached", where Picard and Crusher become telepathically linked as prisoners and learn their true feelings for one another.

McFadden reprised her role for all four TNG movies and also provided her voice for PC games Star Trek: A Final Unity and Star Trek Generations. McFadden directed the seventh season episode "Genesis" (her only directing credit) in which an infection causes the crew to de-evolve into primitive forms of life, and choreographed the dance routine in the fourth season's "Data's Day".

After The Next Generation

McFadden co-starred in the 1990 comedy Taking Care of Business starring James Belushi, and fellow Next Generation alumnus John de Lancie (Q). In 1992, she appeared alongside fellow cast members Patrick Stewart, Jonathan Frakes, Brent Spiner, and Colm Meaney in a production of Every Good Boy Deserves Favour, which was performed in four cities. She also starred in the 1995 television series Marker with Richard Grieco and appeared in the made-for-television movie Crowned and Dangerous with Yasmine Bleeth in 1997. Additional television work was the role of Allison Rourke, Paul Buchman's boss, in four episodes of the sitcom Mad About You. In the spring of 2006, McFadden appeared in a series of television commercials for Microsoft.

She has taught at several universities (American Academy of Dramatic Arts, Brandeis, Harvard, Purdue, Temple, the Stella Academy in Hamburg, and the University of Pittsburgh). As of August 2010, she was listed as an adjunct faculty member in the School of Theater at the University of Southern California. She was the Artistic Director of the Ensemble Studio Theatre/Los Angeles from January 2009 to October 2014. During her tenure, she spearheaded the building of the Atwater Village Theatre Collective, a new two-theater space in Los Angeles.

McFadden has lent her voice as narrator in several audio books. In 2010, she was the narrator of "Confessor" (METAtropolis: Cascadia).

McFadden was one of the last members of the TNG main cast to regularly attend fan conventions, due to a stalking incident early in her Star Trek career. However, she returned to conventions in 2011, and after an exceptionally positive experience at New York Comic Con 2014, she became enthusiastic about such events. In 2017, McFadden was pleased that a recent documentary about the making of Labyrinth led her to connect with fans of her work with Jim Henson.

McFadden narrated the multi-part documentary series The Center Seat: 55 Years of Star Trek, which aired on the cable channel History in 2021.  She was also one of the executive producers.

In 2021 McFadden launched Gates McFadden InvestiGates: Who Do You Think You Are?, a podcast for Brian Volk-Weiss's Nacelle Company, interviewing close friends and former co-stars.

She has since reprised the role of Crusher on Star Trek: Prodigy and Star Trek: Picards third season as well as in the video game Star Trek Online. 

Personal life
McFadden's pregnancy was not written into the fourth season of TNG; instead, her character wore a laboratory coat over her uniform to conceal it. Next Generation co-star Brent Spiner is her son's godfather.

Filmography
Film

Television

TheatreStage appearances (As Cheryl McFadden) Ellen/Mrs. Saunders and Betty, Cloud 9, Theatre De Lys, New York City, 1981.
 (As Cheryl McFadden) Title role, To Gillian on Her 37th Birthday, Ensemble Studio Theatre, New York City, 1983, then Circle in the Square Downtown, New York City, 1984.
 (As Cheryl McFadden) Ruth, The Homecoming, Jewish Repertory Theatre, New York City, 1984.
 (As Cheryl McFadden) Annie Sutter, The Bloodletters, Ensemble Studio Theatre, 1984.
 (As Cheryl McFadden) Casey Staiger, How to Say Goodbye, Vineyard Theatre, New York City, 1986.
 (As Cheryl McFadden) Dr. Handleman, Couch Tandem, Women's Interart Center, New York City, 1987.
 Kate, Emerald City, Perry Street Theatre, New York City, 1988.
 Lil, Voices in the Dark, George Street Playhouse, New Brunswick, NJ, 1998.
 (As Cheryl McFadden) Mary, Rosario and the Gypsies, Ensemble Studio Theatre; and as Mrs. Malloy, The Matchmaker, La Jolla Playhouse, San Diego, CA.
 Viva Detroit, Los Angeles
 Every Good Boy Deserves Favour
 L'Histoire du soldatStage work'''
 (As Cheryl McFadden) Choreographer, The Winter's Tale, Brooklyn Academy of Music Theatre Company, Helen Owen Carey Playhouse, Brooklyn, NY, 1980.
 (As Cheryl McFadden) Fight choreographer, Johnny on the Spot, Brooklyn Academy of Music Theatre Company, Brooklyn Academy of Music, Brooklyn, 1980.
 (As Cheryl McFadden) Choreographer, A Midsummer Night's Dream, Brooklyn Academy of Music Theatre Company, Brooklyn Academy of Music, 1981.
 Choreographer, Yesterday Is Over, Women's InterArt Center, New York City;
 Director, Bottleneck at the Bar, Golden Lion Theatre, New York City;
 Director and Choreographer, Bumps and Knots, Lyric Hammersmith Theatre, London;
 Director and choreographer, Women of Trachis, He Who Gets Slapped, and Old Times, all Springold Theatre, Waltham, MA;
 Director and choreographer, Medea'', Studio Theatre, Pittsburgh, PA.

References

External links

 
 
 
 
 
 

1949 births
Living people
20th-century American actresses
21st-century American actresses
Actresses from Ohio
American choreographers
American female dancers
American film actresses
American musical theatre actresses
American people of Lithuanian descent
American podcasters
American stage actresses
American television actresses
American women choreographers
Brandeis University alumni
Dance teachers
L'École Internationale de Théâtre Jacques Lecoq alumni
People from Akron, Ohio